Edmund Trafford (1526–1590), of Trafford, Lancashire, was an English politician.

He was a Member (MP) of the Parliament of England for Lancashire in 1572.

Trafford owned land in a large number of parishes in Lancashire, Cheshire and Derbyshire. Trafford contributed £100 to the Armada fund in 1588.

References

1526 births
1590 deaths
English MPs 1572–1583
People from Trafford (district)
Members of the Parliament of England (pre-1707) for Lancashire